The 2008–09 NCAA football bowl games, which concluded the 2008 NCAA Division I FBS football season, contained a record number of bowl games scheduled in college football history.  A total of 37 bowl games, 34 team-competitive games and three all-star games, were played starting on December 20, 2008, with four contests and concluding with the Texas vs. The Nation Game in El Paso, Texas, played on January 31, 2009, at Sun Bowl Stadium.  For the first time in 62 years, however, the Hula Bowl was not a part of the post-season as it was cancelled indefinitely.

A new record of 34 team-competitive bowls, plus three all-star games, were played, including the inaugural St. Petersburg Bowl and EagleBank Bowl. While bowl games had been the purview of only the very best teams for nearly a century, this was the third consecutive year that teams with non-winning seasons participated in bowl games. To fill the 68 available team-competitive bowl slots, a new record total of 9 teams (13% of all participants) with non-winning seasons participated in bowl games—all 9 had a .500 (6-6) season.

Selection of the teams
NCAA bylaws say that a school with a record of 6–6 in regular season play and at least 5 wins over FBS teams are eligible only after conferences cannot fill out available positions for bowl games with teams having seven (or more) wins automatically eligible, excluding games played in Hawaii and conference championship games in the ACC, Big 12, Conference USA, MAC and the SEC.

After the final regular-season games on December 7, 2008, four conferences — the Pac-10, the SEC, the Big 12, and the Big Ten — did not have enough teams to fill their bowl game allotments. The Pac-10 had seven contracted bowl slots with only five teams eligible. The last two bowls in the Pac-10 pecking order—the Hawaii Bowl (sixth) and Poinsettia Bowl (seventh)—had contingency contracts with other conferences, respectively Conference USA and the WAC, to select one of the secondary conference's teams should the Pac-10 fail to supply enough eligible teams to supply that bowl. However, because C-USA had only six bowl-eligible teams to fill its six primary bowl slots, the Pac-10/C-USA slot in the Hawaii Bowl became an at-large spot, and was awarded to Notre Dame. The SEC and Big 12 failed to produce enough teams to fill their requirements even before both conferences had two teams selected to BCS games, while the Big Ten was unable to fill its requirements once a second team from that conference (Ohio State) was selected to a BCS game. The Atlantic Coast Conference sent an NCAA-record ten teams to bowl games this season. Since 72 teams were bowl-eligible, but only 68 bowl slots were available, four teams were left out of bowl games. Unlike in 2007, when an eight-win Troy team was left home for the postseason, no team with seven or more wins went without a bowl bid this year. All four uninvited teams — Arkansas State, Bowling Green, Louisiana-Lafayette, and San José State — had six wins.

Results
NOTE: Rankings from final BCS Standings of December 7, 2008.

Non-BCS bowl games

BCS bowl games

Conference bowl representation

NOTE: BCS bowl participants are listed in italics.

Post-BCS All-Star Games

References